The 2014 Red Bull Global RallyCross Championship was the fourth season of the Global RallyCross Championship. Reigning champion Toomas Heikkinen only competed at the X Games event, as he went to the World Rallycross Championship.

Schedule
In July, it was announced that a second event would be held at the Port of Los Angeles event, to replace an event in Detroit which was cancelled.

Entries

Results and standings

Events

Drivers' championship
Points are awarded to event finishers using the following structure:

 3 Points for a Heat Win
 2 Points for a Heat 2nd Place
 1 Point for Heat Participation

Supercars

GRC Lites

{|
|valign="top"|

Manufacturers' championship

References

External links
 

Global RallyCross
GRC Rallycross